The Sentech Tower,  previously named the Albert Hertzog Tower and commonly known as the Brixton Tower, is a  concrete television tower in the Brixton suburb of Johannesburg, South Africa, near the top of the Brixton Ridge. It is a well-known and easily identifiable landmark in the city, alongside its "architectural cousin", the Hillbrow Tower.
Although always intended for both radio and television transmission, it carried only FM radio transmissions until the 1970s.

History 

The tower's construction commenced in 1961, and was completed in 1962. The tower was designed by Ove Arup and Partners and built by Christiani and Nielsen SA. Upon completion, the Brixton Tower was the tallest man-made structure in Africa in its time until it was overtaken by the Hillbrow Tower. It cost R300,000 to construct.

The first transmission took place 22 December 1961. Presently, Sentech broadcasts 18 FM programmes and seven TV stations. Backup power to the tower is 1 MW using two 500 kVA Volvo generators. Towards 2001, naming rights for the tower were sold to Sentech, the TV and radio signal distributor in South Africa owned by the South African Government. Up until 1982, an observation deck affording panoramic views of the city was open to the public, but was closed due to security fears. The tower viewing deck has not re-opened to the public since then.

Construction and structure 

In architectural terms, the Sentech Tower is a vertical cantilever structure with a reinforced concrete shaft.

Geography 

The Sentech Tower is situated in the suburb of Brixton, in Johannesburg, Gauteng, South Africa.

See also 
Hillbrow Tower
Brixton
Johannesburg
List of tallest towers in the world

References

External links 
 
 Johannesburg Landmarks
 Sentech Tower  Buildings | EMPORIS
 Sentech Tower - South Africa :: Plak.co

Buildings and structures in Johannesburg
Towers completed in 1962
Towers in South Africa